Leonine may refer to:

Lions
 Leonine facies, a face that resembles that of a lion

Popes Leo
 Leonine City, a part of the city of Rome
 Leonine College, a college for priests in training, in Rome, Italy
 Leonine Prayers, a set of prayers that from 1884 to early 1965 were prescribed by the Popes for recitation after Low Mass
 Leonine Sacramentary, a manuscript written in the seventh century

Other
 Leonine (coin), a coin minted in Europe and used in England as a debased form of the sterling silver penny, outlawed under Edward I
 Leonine verse, a type of Latin versification based on internal rhyme
 Leonine, a minor character in Shakespeare's Pericles, Prince of Tyre
 Leonine Holding, formerly Tele München Group, is a media company based in Munich owned by KKR

See also
 Lenine (disambiguation)
 Leonina (disambiguation)